Louis Charles Karpinski (5 August 1878 – 25 January 1956) was an American mathematician.

Background

Louis Charles Karpinski was born on August 5, 1878, in Rochester, New York.  His parents were Henry Hermanagle Karpinski of Warsaw, Poland, and Mary Louise Engesser of Guebweiler, Alsace. He was educated at Cornell University and in Europe at Strassburg.  Karpinski also studied (1909–1910) at Columbia.

Career
At Columbia, Karpinski became a fellow and a university extension lecturer.  He taught at Berea College and at Oswego, New York at the Normal School there.  Then, he accepted a position at the University of Michigan, where by 1919 he became full professor of mathematics. Dr. Karpinski devoted his attention chiefly to the history and pedagogy of mathematics.

Books 

An authority on the history of science, Karpinski was collaborator on the Archivo di Storia della Scienza and author of The Hindu-Arabic Numerals, with David Eugene Smith (1911), Robert of Chester's Latin Translation of the Algebra of Al-Khowarizmi (1915), and 
Unified Mathematics, with H. Y. Benedict and J. W. Calhoun (1913), and subsequently produced other publications. He served as the president of the History of Science Society from 1943–44.

 The Hindu-Arabic Numerals (with David Eugene Smith). Boston: Ginn and Company, 1911.
 Robert of Chester's Latin Translation of the Algebra of Al-Khowarizmi, with an Introduction, Critical Notes and an English Version. New York: Macmillan Co., 1915.
 Mathematical Pamphlets (n.p.): (n.p.), 1915.
 Unified Mathematics (with Harry Y. Benedict and John W. Calhoun). Boston: D.C. Heath and Company, 1918 and 1922.
 The History of Arithmetic Chicago: Rand McNally and Co., 1925.
 Bibliography of the Printed Maps of Michigan, 1804–1880. Lansing: Michigan Historical Commission, 1931.
 Historical Atlas of the Great Lakes and Michigan. Lansing: Michigan Historical Commission, 1931.
 Bibliography of Mathematical Works Printed in America through 1850. Ann Arbor: University of Michigan Press, 1940.

See also
 Robert of Chester
 al-Khwārizmī

References

External links
LCK as a chess player
Mathematics Genealogy
Louis C. Karpinski Mathematics Textbook Database
 
 

1878 births
1956 deaths
20th-century American mathematicians
American science writers
Cornell University alumni
American historians of mathematics
Scientists from Rochester, New York
University of Michigan faculty
Mathematicians from New York (state)
Historians from New York (state)